The Gross Sättelistock is a mountain of the Urner Alps, located on the border between the cantons of Nidwalden and Obwalden in Central Switzerland. It lies north of Engelberg.

References

External links
 Gross Sättelistock on Hikr

Mountains of the Alps
Mountains of Switzerland
Mountains of Nidwalden
Mountains of Obwalden
Two-thousanders of Switzerland